The Rumjacks are a celtic punk band originally formed in Sydney, Australia in 2008. Known for their loud and energetic live shows, the band has released five studio albums, two live albums, and a series of EPs and singles. In 2016, the Rumjacks relocated to various parts of Europe, where they currently live and tour.

One of the band's best-known songs, "An Irish Pub Song", became a viral hit and has earned over 80 million views on YouTube.

members
Current members
 Mike Rivkees – vocals, tin whistle, acoustic guitar (2020–present)
 Gabe Whitbourne – guitar, backing vocals (2008–present)
 Pietro Della Sala – drums (2016–present)
 Adam Kenny – mandolin, bouzouki, banjo, backing vocals (2008–present)
 Johnny McKelvey bass, backing vocals – (2008–present)

Former members
 Anthony Matters – drums (2008–2016)
 Frankie McLaughlin – vocals, tin whistle, guitar (2008–2020)

History
Formed in 2008, the Rumjacks combine a variety of musical influences, including elements of punk rock and traditional Celtic folk. They released their debut EP Hung, Drawn & Portered, which was followed by their second EP Sound as a Pound later that year. The Rumjacks secured international support from punk legends like U.K Subs, GBH, and Gypsy punk legends Gogol Bordello.

After early lineup changes, the band maintained their lineup of lead singer Frankie McLaughlin, bassist Johnny McKelvey, drummer Anthony Matters, guitarist Gabriel Whitbourne and banjo/mandolin/bouzouki player Adam Kenny, recording three critically acclaimed albums together: Gangs of New Holland (2010), Sober and Godless (2015), and Sleeping Rough (2016), before Matters' departure after their 2016 European tour.

The Rumjacks have also performed on European tours. The first European tour, in 2015, included the Jarocin Festival in Poland and Boomtown in the UK, and was followed by their 2016 Euro tour, where they performed at festivals like Woodstock Poland, Mighty Sounds, Punk Rock Holiday, and the Lowlands Festival. The Rumjacks embarked on their first US tour in March 2017, which included performances at San Diego's Get Shamrocked Festival Launch Party and Austin's South by Southwest Music Festival. The band later toured across Europe in 2019.

Rivkees began filling in for Dropkick Murphys singer Al Barr in February 2022. Barr was forced to drop off of his band's tour to take care of his ailing mother.

"An Irish Pub Song"
An international breakthrough for the band came with their 2011 single, "An Irish Pub Song", which was taken from the 2010 album Gangs of New Holland. The song is an observational commentary on the fact that there are Irish-styled pubs in every part of the world, and a protest against what the band saw as a commercialization and inauthentic expression of Irish diaspora culture. The song's official music video amassed over 77 million views on YouTube.

In 2016 Billboard published an article stating the song was #4 of the 25 "Most Popular St Patricks Day" songs on YouTube for the US demographic, before becoming #5 in 2017, #3 in 2018, and #5 in 2019.

Saints Preserve Us 
In early 2018 the band recorded their fourth studio album Saints Preserve Us over two weeks in Milan, Italy at Crono Sound Factory. It was the first album to feature new drummer Pietro Della Sala. Paul McKenzie from the Real McKenzies was featured on the duet "The Foreman O’Rourke", and Mickey Rickshaw appeared on the song "Billy McKinley". The album includes a version of the Irish classic  (The Mad Puck Goat), which is sung in Irish. The album was released on 12 October 2018. At the end of 2018, the band toured Southeast Asia for the first time and went to Japan, Malaysia, and Indonesia.

Collaborations
 The Rumjacks featured on the song "Shandon Bells", from The Moorings' 2014 EP Nicky's Detox.
 The band also featured on the Rumpled's "The Ugly Side", from the 2018 album Ashes & Wishes.
 In 2019 the Rumjacks recorded their version of "Christmas in Killarney" for Punk Rock Christmas, Volume 2 released by USA label Cleopatra Records.
 McLaughlin featured on the song "True Story", from The Clan's 2016 album All In The Name Of Folk, and also on Maleducazione Alcolica's song "Hometown", from the band's 2019 album Chiacchiere da bar.

Legal issues 
McLaughlin was sentenced for three domestic violence offences in 2012: an assault occasioning actual bodily harm committed on 2 March 2010; a further assault occasioning actual bodily harm committed on 18 August 2010; and a common assault committed on 26 September 2010, which the band addressed publicly through their Facebook page at the time. Due to public backlash, the Rumjacks released another statement in 2016. He was removed from the band in April 2020 due to bad behaviour and violent acts towards band members and support crew.

Discography

Studio albums

Extended plays

Live albums

Singles
Crosses for Eyes (2012)
Blows & Unkind Words (2014)
Plenty (2014)
Home (2015)
A Fistful O’ Roses (2016)
Fact’ry Jack (2016)
One For The Road (2021)
Bloodsoaked in Chorus (2021)
Bounding Main (2022)
Kicking Soles (2022)

Music videos

References

External links
Official website

Australian punk rock groups
Celtic punk groups
Irish-Australian culture
Musical groups from Sydney
Musical groups established in 2008